Robert "Bobby" Prem (born 12 June 1957) is a German sailor from Berlin who competed in two Paralympics games, winning gold in 2008 and a silver medal in 2012 both times in the in sonar class with skipper Jens Kroker and fellow crew member Siegmund Mainka.

References

External links
 
 

1957 births
Living people
German disabled sportspeople
German male sailors (sport)
Sonar class world champions
Disabled sailing world champions
World champions in sailing for Germany
Paralympic sailors of Germany
Paralympic medalists in sailing
Paralympic gold medalists for Germany
Paralympic silver medalists for Germany
Sailors at the 2008 Summer Paralympics
Sailors at the 2012 Summer Paralympics